Carlos Trillo Name (21 March 1941 in Havana, Cuba – 27 July 2022 Havana, Cuba) was a Cuban painter.

Mr. Trillo is considered a self-taught painter.  He lived in New York City from 1954 to 1961. He  currently resides in El Cerro, Havana, Cuba. He was a member of the "Espacio 5" (Pedro de Orá, Raimundo García, Carlos Trillo Name, Félix Beltrán, Raul Santos Serpa y Juan T. Vázquez Martín) a Cuban artistic movement.

Individual exhibitions

Some of his individual exhibitions have been: Trillo Expone en el Lyceum (1967), Lyceum and Lawn Tennis Club, Havana, Cuba; Trillo Quince Texturas (1970), Galeria MINSAP, Havana, Cuba; Carlos Trillo Expone (1972), Galeria UNEAC, Havana, Cuba; Ocres y Azules, Carlos Trillo (1974), Biblioteca Nacional José Martí, Havana, Cuba; Trillo Pinturas (1980), Casa de la Cultura de Plaza, Havana, Cuba; Manhattan 97 (1998), Hotel Tryp Habana Libre, Havana, Cuba; and Manhattan 9/11 y Despues (2007), Galeria La Aracia, Havana, Cuba.

Collective exhibitions

His painting has been part of many collective exhibitions, among them: Exposicion de Pintura (1966) at the Galeria del Instituto Nacional de Turismo, Havana, Cuba; Pintores Cubanos (1982) at the Galeria IAO in the Universidad Veracruzana, Veracruz, Mexico; Por la Libertad y La Aministia Total (1984) at the Centro Culteral de Conde de Duque in Madrid, Spain, Maison des Sciences de L'Homme, Paris, France, Instituto de Bellas Artes, Mexico City, Mexico; Contemporary Cuban Art (1994) at the Westbeth Gallery, New York City; Cuban Art: The last 60 Years (1994) at Pan-American Gallery, Dallas, Texas; and Cuba Art and Soul (2007) Galeria El Museo, Santa Fe, New Mexico.

References
 La Gaceta de Cuba; Trillo Renovado by Jose Veigas, November–December edition 2005.
 La Gaceta de Cuba; El Encuentro con la Materia Viva by Guillermo Rodriguez-Rivera, January–February 1997.
 Bienvenidos; Un Pintor Materico y Abstracto a la Vez by Augusto Rios, April 2007.
 Granma, "Galeria Adentro" by Tony Pinera, June 7, 1990.
 Bohemia; Arte Soy by Leonel Lopez-Nussa, February 7, 1975.

External links
 https://web.archive.org/web/20090423120233/http://www.carlostrillo.com/
 http://www.lajiribilla.co.cu/2005/n222_08/222_03.html
 http://commons.wikimedia.org/wiki/File:Carlos_Trillo_Name_-_Attack_to_Irak_-5_2004.JPG
 http://commons.wikimedia.org/wiki/File:Carlos_Trillo_Name_-_Secrets_2009_(mixed_media_on_canvas).JPG

20th-century Cuban painters
20th-century Cuban male artists
21st-century Cuban painters
21st-century male artists
Cuban contemporary artists
1941 births
Living people
People from Havana
Male painters